Raquel E. Gur is an American psychiatrist known for her research on schizophrenia. She is Professor of Psychiatry, Neurology, and Radiology at the University of Pennsylvania Perelman School of Medicine. She has been a faculty member of the University of Pennsylvania's Department of Psychiatry since 1975, and serves as Karl and Linda Rickels Professor of Psychiatry and Vice Chair of Research Development within this department. She has served as president of both the Society of Biological Psychiatry and the American College of Neuropsychopharmacology. She was elected as a fellow of the American College of Neuropsychopharmacology in 2000 and to the National Academy of Medicine in 2001. In 2011, she received the William C. Menninger Memorial Award from the American College of Physicians.

References

External links
Faculty page

Living people
American women psychiatrists
Schizophrenia researchers
Hebrew University of Jerusalem alumni
Michigan State University alumni
University of Pennsylvania alumni
Perelman School of Medicine at the University of Pennsylvania faculty
Perelman School of Medicine at the University of Pennsylvania alumni
Members of the National Academy of Medicine
Year of birth missing (living people)